Gothra is a village in the Bhiwani district of the Indian state of Haryana. , the village had 556 households with a total population of 2,631 of which 1,391 were male and 1,240 female.

Description
The village contains approximately 700 houses. Gothra has been able to gain popularity in its surrounding areas for a comparatively large number of military personnel and its temple. The village is surrounded by other smaller villages- Kushalpura, Gignaw, Jhanjhra, Singhani. Gothra is a famous village in Bawni (52 village of Sheoran Gotra spread in Loharu & Badhra tehsil). The people of Gothra village also participated in freedom movement against Nawab of Loharu.

References

Villages in Bhiwani district